The Beijing Independent Film Festival is an annual independent film festival that took place in Songzhuang, China from 2004 to 2014. It has a history of being challenged by the Chinese authorities.

The organizer of the event is the Li Xianting Film Fund, founded by Li Xianting. The executive director is Fan Rong.

The government cut the festival's power on opening night in 2012, limited screenings to no more than 2 people in 2013, before detaining organizers and barricading screening rooms in 2014. The government also confiscated an irreplaceable archive of independent films. That 11th edition of the festival, scheduled to run from Saturday 23 August 2014 until the end of the month did not open, after police detained the organizers and forced them to write a letter to say they were cancelling the event. Police blocked off access to the site, while electricity to the venue was cut off. Organizers said the local authorities had been unhelpful in the days leading up to the festival's opening and pressure had been brought to bear for the event not to proceed. It was understood by the organizers that the government was concerned the festival would be used as a forum to criticize the government.

A version of the festival was screened in New York City in 2015 with a collection of some of the festival's best independent films from 2012-2014.

References

See also 
 Beijing International Film Festival, a film festival sponsored by the Beijing Municipal Government
 Beijing Queer Film Festival
 List of film festivals in China

Film festivals in China
Annual events in Beijing
2003 establishments in China
Recurring events established in 2003
Festivals in Beijing